Chaman Zar-e Olya (also Romanized as Chaman Zār-e 'Olyā; also known as Cheshmeh Nezār, Cheshmeh Nezār-e 'Olyā, and Cheshmeh-ye Naz̧ar Bālā) is a village in Bazan Rural District, in the Central District of Javanrud County, Kermanshah Province, Iran. At the 2006 census, its population was 170, in 39 families.

References 

Populated places in Javanrud County